Power Rangers S.P.D. is the thirteenth season of the television series, Power Rangers, and is based on the 28th Super Sentai series Tokusou Sentai Dekaranger. The season shares its title with the Korean dub of Dekaranger in South Korea, whose logo is similar to the American series. The initials in the title stand for "Space Patrol Delta"; in Dekaranger, it stood for Special Police Dekaranger, and in the South Korean dub of Dekaranger, it stood for Special Police Delta. The season debuted on February 5, 2005 as part of Jetix, originally airing on ABC Family; beginning with "Messenger, Part 2", the series moved to Toon Disney.

A Japanese dub of S.P.D. started airing on Toei's digital television channel in Japan starting in August 2011, with two DVD volumes released on August 5. It features the original Dekaranger cast members dubbing over the voices of their American counterparts (with the exception of Mako Ishino, who is the series' narrator rather than voicing her character's counterpart).

Plot 

The story takes place in the year 2025, 21 years after the events of the previous season when Earth has welcomed alien beings to live peacefully with the human race. However, peace is short-lived as the planet-conquering Troobian Empire and its leader Emperor Gruumm turns its destructive attention to Earth. When the Earth's first line of defense, the Space Patrol Delta A-Squad mysteriously vanishes without a trace, the protection of the planet falls to their replacements: B-Squad Rangers Schuyler "Sky" Tate, Bridge Carson and Sydney "Syd" Drew, under the guidance of their dog-like alien commander, Anubis "Doggie" Cruger. When reformed thieves Jack Landors and Elizabeth "Z" Delgado join the team as the Red and Yellow S.P.D Rangers, tensions threaten to tear them apart. With the alien threat growing stronger every moment, the Rangers must put aside their differences and go into action as one.

During B-Squad's attempts to hold off Gruumm's forces, including pictomancer Mora and bat-like Broodwing, the team discovers that Cruger used to be a Ranger himself, but fled to Earth and swore off his Ranger duties after failing to protect his home planet and the apparent death of his wife Isinia; however, attacks by old enemies reveal that Isinia is actually alive and in Gruumm's clutches, forcing him to return to active status as the Shadow Ranger. They are later joined by the Omega Ranger, a future version of a kid they saved sent back in order to prevent B-Squad's destruction from having a negative effect on his time.

Things come to a head when A-Squad returns and reveals they had not disappeared but in fact defected upon believing that fighting against Gruumm's forces was a losing battle, resulting in both Cruger and B-Squad being captured, though they quickly escape. As B-Squad subdue their rogue teammates and route the Troobian's invasion, Cruger attacks Gruumm and rescues Isinia. However, Gruumm survives his army's destruction, leading to a final battle between him and Cruger and his arrest. Afterwards, Jack, having becoming disillusioned by the direction his life is going as a Ranger, abruptly quits the team, prompting Cruger to promote Sky as the replacement Red Ranger.

Cast and characters
Power Rangers
 Brandon Jay McLaren as Jack Landors, the S.P.D. Red Ranger.
 Chris Violette as Schuyler "Sky" Tate, the S.P.D. Blue Ranger.
 Matt Austin as Bridge Carson, the S.P.D. Green Ranger.
 Monica May as Elizabeth "Z" Delgado, the S.P.D. Yellow Ranger.
 Alycia Purrott as Sydney "Syd" Drew, the S.P.D. Pink Ranger.
 John Tui as Anubis "Doggie" Cruger, S.P.D. Shadow Ranger.
 Brett Stewart as Sam, the S.P.D. Omega Ranger.
 Michelle Langstone as Dr. Katherine "Kat" Manx, the S.P.D. Kat Ranger.
 Antonia Prebble as Nova, the S.P.D. Nova Ranger.

Supporting characters
 Barnie Duncan as Piggy
 Kelson Henderson as Boom
 Beth Allen as Ally Samuels
 Tandi Wright as the voice of Isinia Cruger
 Paul Norell as Supreme Commander Fowler Birdie
 John Tui as Sergeant Silverback

Villains
 Rene Naufahu as Emperor Gruumm
 Olivia James-Baird as Mora
 Josephine Davison as Morgana
 Jim McLarty as the voice of Broodwing
 Derek Judge as the voice of Blue-Head Krybots
 James Gaylyn as the voice of Orange Head Krybots and Zeltrax
 Geoff Dolan as the voice of Omni The Magnificence

A-Squad
 Gina Varela as Charlie, A-Squad Red Ranger.
 Nick Kemplen (voice) as A-Squad Blue Ranger.
 Thomas Kiwi & Nick Kemplen (voice) as A-Squad Green Ranger.
 Allan Smith & Greg Cooper II (voice) as A-Squad Yellow Ranger.
 Motoko Nagino & Claire Dougan (voice) as A-Squad Pink Ranger.

Guest stars
 James Napier Robertson as Conner McKnight, the Red Dino Ranger and Triassic Ranger.
 Kevin Duhaney as Ethan James, the Blue Dino Ranger.
 Emma Lahana as Kira Ford, the Yellow Dino Ranger.
 Jeffrey Parazzo as  Trent Fernandez, the White Dino Ranger and the voice of the Black Dino Ranger.

Episodes

Video game

There was one game produced for the Space Patrol Delta series, a side-scroller on the Game Boy Advance by THQ. The 6 rangers fight minor enemies until they encounter the main boss. There are racing levels which involve piloting the Red, Yellow, or Pink Delta Runners, a Space Invaders style targeting game with the Green Delta Runner, a racing level involving R.I.C. (the Rangers' robotic dog), and Megazord battle levels.

Comics
A new monthly comic strip based on the series appeared in every issue of Jetix Magazine in the UK in 2005. Jetix Magazine is the official magazine of Jetix, the channel that showed S.P.D. in the UK in 2006. The strip was the first Power Rangers strip to be written by Transformers writer Simon Furman, collaborating for the first time on the PR strip with equally popular TF artist Andrew Wildman, who had previously done artwork for other Power Rangers strips under Jetix Magazines' previous banner of Fox Kids' Wicked.

During the strip, a running subplot involving a rogue Krybot who had become self-aware and rebelled against Grumm gradually unfolded, he would resurface to warn SPD of Grumm's invasion attempt in the final story and supply Jack with a device that once inserted on the Terror, would incapacitate the Krybot fleet.

The strip ended with its own conclusion to the SPD series, the first time any comic strip version of Power Rangers has done a different take on a PR finale. In the strip, A-Squad is brainwashed instead of corrupted and turn against their superiors. The B-Squad regulars deal with them and help Cruger defeat and overcome both Grumm and Omni, before being promoted to A-Squad status.

In 2018, the SPD Rangers appeared in Boom! Studios's "Shattered Grid", a crossover event between teams from all eras commemorating the 25th anniversary of the original television series. It was published in Mighty Morphin Power Rangers #25-30 and various tie-ins. A Power Rangers SPD story by Caleb Goellner and Patrick Mulholland was published in Mighty Morphin Power Rangers 2018 Annual as part of the crossover.

References

External links
 Official Power Rangers Website
 

 
SPD
2000s American science fiction television series
2005 American television series debuts
2005 American television series endings
American Broadcasting Company original programming
Space adventure television series
Television series set in the 2020s
Television shows filmed in New Zealand
Fiction set around Sirius
Fiction set in 2025
English-language television shows
American time travel television series
Television series by Disney
Television series about size change
ABC Family original programming
American children's action television series
American children's adventure television series
American children's fantasy television series